Bursting Out with the All-Star Big Band! is a 1962 studio album by Oscar Peterson.

Track listing 
 "Blues for Big Scotia" (Oscar Peterson) – 5:55
 "West Coast Blues" (Wes Montgomery) – 3:57
 "Here's That Rainy Day" (Jimmy Van Heusen, Johnny Burke) – 4:03
 "I Love You" (Cole Porter) – 2:39
 "Daahoud" (Clifford Brown) – 2:57
 "Tricrotism" (Oscar Pettiford) – 4:12
 "I'm Old Fashioned" (Jerome Kern, Johnny Mercer) – 4:27
 "Young and Foolish" (Arnold B. Horwitt, Albert Hague) – 4:51
 "Manteca" (Dizzy Gillespie, Gil Fuller, Chano Pozo) – 4:04

Personnel

Performance 
 Oscar Peterson - piano
 Ray Brown - double bass
 Ed Thigpen - drums
 Nat Adderley - cornet
 Roy Eldridge - trumpet
 Jimmy Nottingham
 Ernie Royal
 Snooky Young
 Clark Terry - trumpet, flugelhorn
 Jimmy Cleveland - trombone
 Paul Faulise
 Slide Hampton
 Melba Liston
 Britt Woodman
 Ray Alonge - french horn
 Jim Buffington
 Willie Ruff
 Morris Secon
 Julius Watkins
 Don Butterfield - tuba
 Cannonball Adderley - alto saxophone
 Norris Turney
 James Moody - tenor saxophone
 Jerome Richardson
 George Dorsey - baritone saxophone
 Seldon Powell
 Ernie Wilkins - conductor, arranger

References 

1962 albums
Oscar Peterson albums
Albums arranged by Ernie Wilkins
Albums produced by Norman Granz
Verve Records albums
Albums conducted by Ernie Wilkins